= Reza Bahrami Nejad =

Iranian filmmaker, film producer, critic and art director

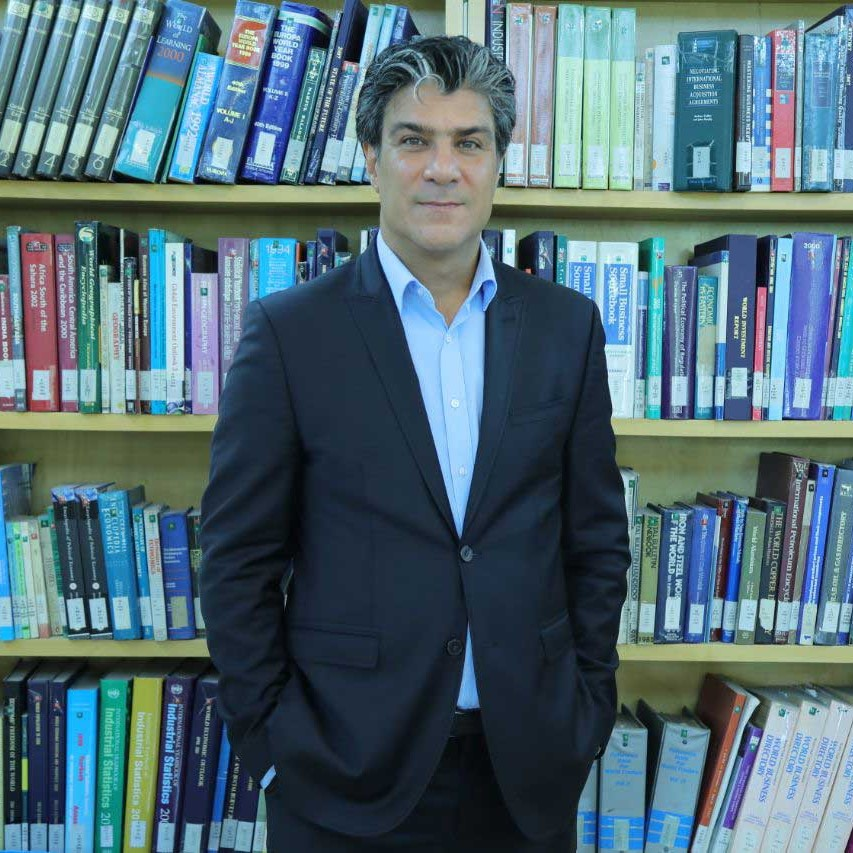
- Reza Bahrami Nejad
- Born: 1978 (age 47–48); Isfahan, Iran
- Occupations: Filmmaker, screenwriter
- Years active: 1997–present

Reza Bahram Nezhad (born 1978 in Isfahan) is an Iranian filmmaker, film producer, critic and art director. He has made several documentaries for TV channels and advertisement videos for leading brands. He has also written several articles on cinema and media in famous Iranian journals and magazines, as well as his personal web-blog. The main theme of his works is the relation among culture, Art, people's daily life, and the humans' society.

== Film Production Activity ==
Since 1999 he has begun his film production activity. Some of his films, e.g., Flying Masters, were being shown across the globe and were recognized as indeed impacting films by renowned critics. This documentary is about an Alternative Rock Band from the North of Iran, where Reza was the drummer. This documentary was produced by French ARTE channel and Article Z company, and was repeatedly nominated and shown as representative of the current modern situation of IRAN. British channel 4 has named this documentary as “Novel talents” and was broadcast by this channel.

== Bahrami Studio Foundation In ==
2011 he founded his own studio named "Bahrami Studio" where he runsand manages diverse and innovative art projects. In this studio, it isaimed to combine art with different medias to offer wide range ofservices to clients. One of the most successful projects by this studio was “The Flying Classroom” which has received tremendous attention and appraise from people and media. In this continuous project, a team consisting of 10 artists &designers goes to different schools staging various workshops from music to puppet making, handicrafts, wall papers& other stuff for children during two-day stays. At the end of each event, children –with help from the artists- design a part of the school on their own using what they have made during the workshops.
