= Flying classroom =

The Flying Classroom (Persian: کلاس پرنده) was a philanthropic art and education project founded by Iranian filmmaker and artist Reza Bahrami Nejad through Bahrami Studio in 2011. The initiative combines art, design, and creativity with school-building and renovation projects.

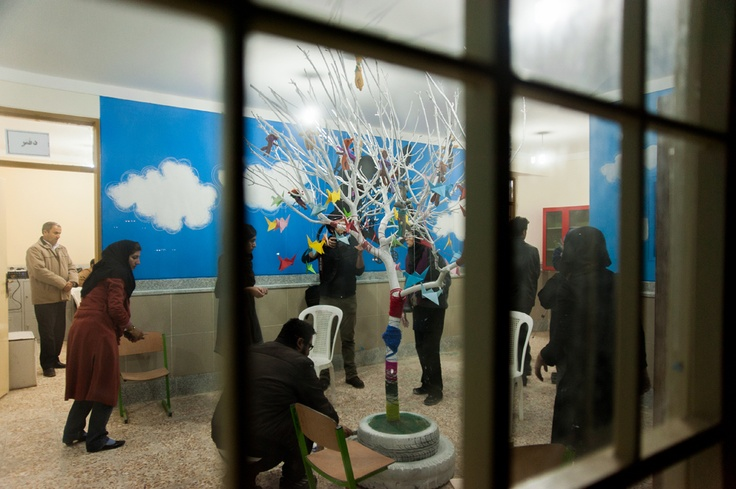
Ilam, Iran. Flying Classroom project 2014

The program involves a team of around ten artists and designers who travel to schools across Iran in different regions and organize two-day workshops for children. These workshops include music, puppetry, handicrafts, mural painting, and other creative activities. At the end of each program, children, with guidance from the artists, design or redesign a part of their school using the artworks they created.

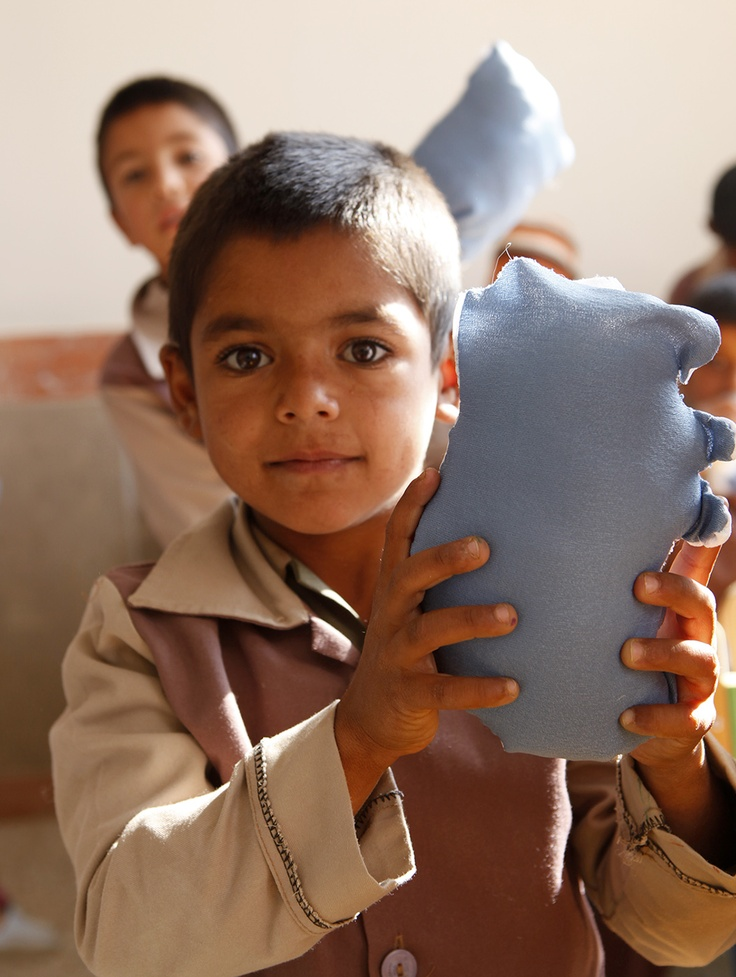
School student, during Flying Classroom project, Kharanaghan 2019

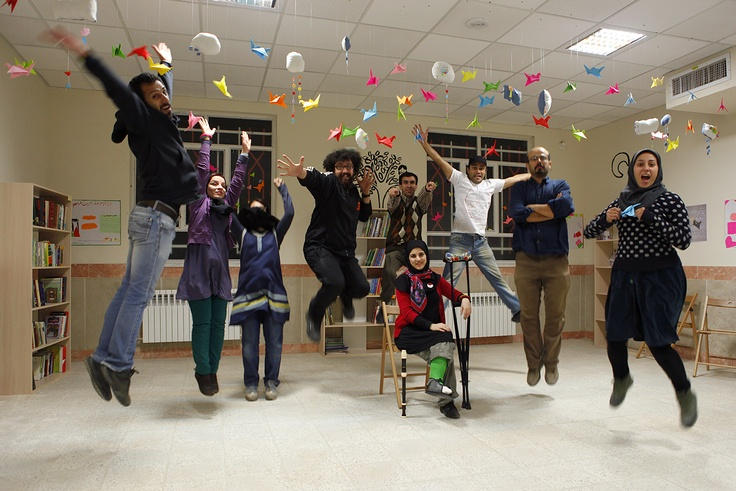
Part of The Flying Classroom team 2012

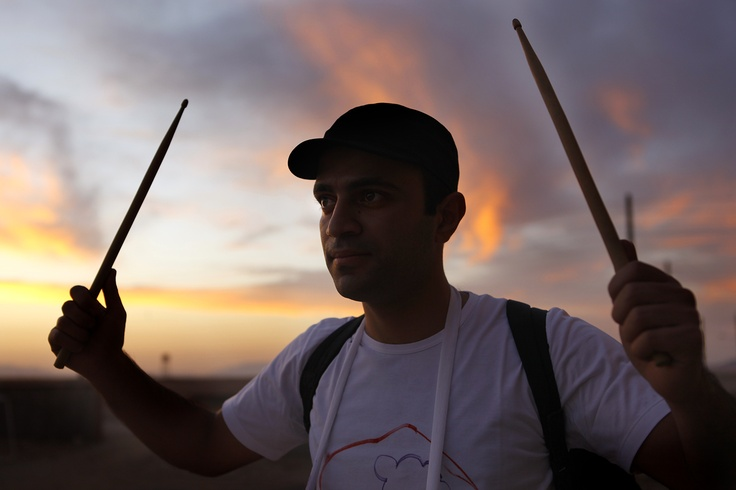
Different renowned Iranian artists get involve in each Flying Classroom project

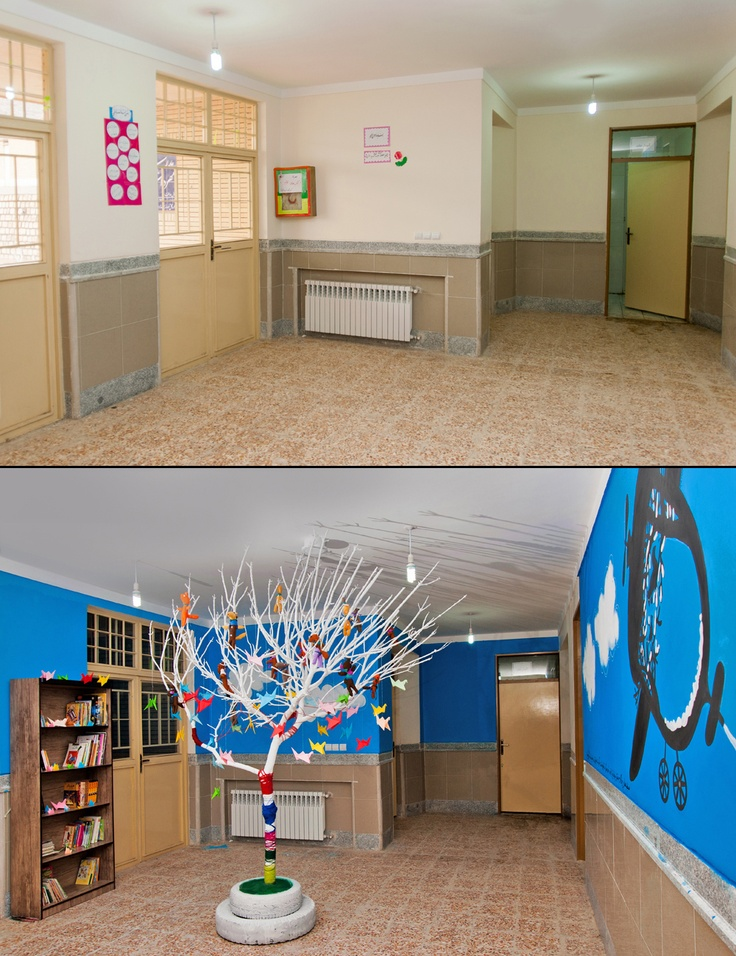
The Flying Classroom project. Ilam, Iran 2014 (before/after)

Over the years, a number of Iranian artists and designers have collaborated with The Flying Classroom in leading workshops and co-creating projects with children.
